D. P. Agarwal is the ex Chairman of the Union Public Service Commission of India. He was the predecessor of former chairman Rajni Razdan.

Biography
D. P. Agarwal received his M.Tech. and Ph.D. degrees from IIT Delhi in 1972 and 1978 respectively. Prior to this, he graduated in Mechanical Engineering with honors from Aligarh Muslim University in 1970. He taught at department of mechanical engineering in IIT Delhi and was also the warden of Kumaon hostel.   Professor Agrawal was the Chairman, Union Public Service Commission (UPSC), New Delhi since 16 August 2008, prior to which he was a Member in the Union Public Service Commission since 31 October 2003. The Chairman is appointed by the President of India and is at 9A in the Government of India Warrant of precedence. His wanted to join civil services after graduation from AMU  and wrote UPSC civil services examination.  Prior to the present position, Professor Agrawal was the founder Director of the Indian Institute of Information Technology and Management (IIITM), Gwalior. Agrawal started his career as a faculty in the Department of Mechanical Engineering, IIT Delhi in 1975. In 1994, from being a Professor and Dean at IIT Delhi, he took over as the Joint Educational Adviser (Technical) in the Ministry of Human Resource Development, Government of India. While at the Ministry, he initiated policies for the growth of quality technical education and contributed to the development of Centers for Excellence in higher technical and polytechnic education. Professor Agrawal was the Managing Director of Educational Consultants India Ltd. (EdCIL), a Government of India PSU, where he brought about major changes in the organizational work culture including decentralized decision making and transferring functional responsibilities to lower executives. Professor Agrawal has been very active in Teaching and Research throughout his career and has supervised over 100 theses including 20 Ph.D.s and published over 150 research papers. His research papers have received awards in India & abroad. Though many of these awards are no less than Nobel prize, he was not given full professorship by IIT Delhi. He has been an editorial member of national and international journals and has been a key note speaker at various conference sessions. Professor Agrawal is a fellow/ member of a number of professional institutions and societies in India and abroad. He has received many awards including, Eminent Engineer 2003, Engineer of the Year 2006 conferred by the Institution of Engineers, Honorary Fellowship of ISTE, 2006, Honorary D. Sc. degree of Jiwaji University, Gwalior 2009, and the Honorary Fellowship of IETE in 2011. He is a highly respected public speaker and has articulated issues of innovation, quality education, public services, and Information technology for the development of the common man.

He held the post of Director, Indian Institute of Information technology & Management, Gwalior. In addition to the chairman there are ten other members.

Reforms in UPSC
Prof Agrawal has been instrumental in revolutionizing the working of UPSC by implementing two major initiatives in his role as Chairman:
 First was to revamp the recruitment process of UPSC by introducing aptitude tests in the recruitment examination process.
Second was the introduction of e-governance initiatives at UPSC including online application process for recruitment exams

References

Living people
Academic staff of IIT Delhi
Chairmen of Union Public Service Commission
Year of birth missing (living people)